Laurent Rioux (born January 1, 1943) is a Canadian former racing driver from Montreal, Quebec who made three NASCAR Winston Cup Series starts in 1983 and 1984. His best finish in a points race was 17th in the 1983 Goody's 500 at Martinsville Speedway. He failed to qualify for the Daytona 500 both times he attempted it (in 1983 and 1984), but finished second in the consolation race in 1984.

Rioux also made 15 Busch North Series starts from 1979 to 1981.

Motorsports career results

NASCAR
(key) (Bold – Pole position awarded by qualifying time. Italics – Pole position earned by points standings or practice time. * – Most laps led.)

Winston Cup Series

Daytona 500

References

External links

1943 births
Living people
NASCAR drivers
Racing drivers from Quebec
Sportspeople from Montreal